BOC Ltd is a British based multinational, industrial gas company, more commonly known as BOC, now a part of Linde plc. In September 2004, BOC had over 30,000 employees on six continents, with sales of over £10.6 billion. BOC was a constituent of the FTSE 100 Index and the FT 30. On 5 September 2006 the BOC Group became part of the Linde Group of Germany.

History

Early years as Brin's Oxygen Company (1886–1905)
Brin's Oxygen Company, Ltd. was formed in 1886, by two French brothers, Arthur and Leon Brin. In the early years, the company manufactured oxygen using a high-temperature barium oxide process, known as the Brin process, developed from the work of French scientist Jean-Baptiste Boussingault. The main application for gaseous oxygen at that time was in connection with the generation of limelight, used in magic lanterns and theatre lighting.

A major new market emerged around 1903, with the development of the oxyacetylene welding process. Around the same time, new cryogenic air separation processes had been devised independently in Britain, the United States and Germany. The German engineer and founder of the Linde Group, Carl von Linde, won the patent for the process. The Brin brothers negotiated an agreement to use the Linde patents. In exchange, von Linde was given a stake and a board position in Brin's Oxygen Company, which he held until 1914. The new process replaced the inefficient barium oxide process, paving the way for larger-scale and more efficient production.

As BOC and expansion (1906–1978)
In 1906, the Brin brothers renamed the company the British Oxygen Company, or BOC. During the First World War, the business increased significantly as the mass production of needed war machinery—ships, tanks and trucks—involved either metal cutting or welding. In the post-war period, it grew by acquisitions, which included Sparklets Ltd, Allen-Liversidge Ltd and the Quasi-Arc Company.

During the Second World War, the gases for munitions and for medical needs were provided by BOC. As in the First World War, the business grew. After the war, BOC formed subsidiaries in over twenty countries. In the 1950s, due to the increased demand for automobiles, improved methods of manufacturing steel were invented which required "tonnage" oxygen. This meant a further increase in business for BOC.

BOC diversified into many industries in the 1960s and '70s. One was the refrigeration market and it set up a joint venture called BOC-Linde Refrigeration Ltd., with Linde AG of Germany in 1968. It also acquired Ace Refrigeration Ltd and J. Muirhead Ltd, quick-frozen food suppliers, in 1969.

With the plan of expanding into the Far East, it set up British Oxygen (Far East) Ltd, based in Tokyo. It established subsidiaries and joint ventures in Jamaica, the Netherlands, South Africa, Sweden and Spain for a number of products; which included transformers, magnetising equipment, frozen foods, stable isotopes, radioactively labelled compounds and cryogenic systems. In 1971, the company installed the largest mainframe computer in Britain, linking a network of computers throughout the country, and sold computer time to outside customers. As a result, BOC diversified into the computer business.

The 1973 oil crisis led to a rethinking of BOC's future strategy. It divested non-strategic assets; and concentrated on its primary business, especially the gases and health care markets, and the expansion of these businesses to Europe, the Americas and the Far East. In 1975, the company officially became 'BOC International Ltd', reflecting its success in developing business outside of Britain, and in products beyond oxygen.

BOC Group (1978–2006)
An important part of BOC's history was the acquisition of Airco Industrial Gases, an American competitor. After 11 years of litigation, in 1978 Airco became a wholly owned subsidiary of BOC. The enlarged company changed its name to the BOC Group.

In 1999, reports emerged that the U.S. industrial gases company Praxair, which in 1992 spun off from Linde AG's U.S. division, 'Union Carbide Industrial Gases', were in possible merger discussions with BOC Group. Following the breakup of the talks, France's L'Air Liquide S.A. and Air Products & Chemicals Inc. made a series of cash offers to acquire the group. On 13 July 1999, the BOC board approved a pre-conditional cash offer of £14.60 per share. The BOC Group's assets were to be divided between Air Liquide and Air Products in the US$11 billion deal. On 12 May 2000, the bid lapsed, following failure to reach a satisfactory agreement with the United States Federal Trade Commission.

Following the collapse of the bid, BOC Group developed a new strategy to stimulate business growth in new products and markets and to reshape its existing portfolio of businesses to improve Group performance. In 2001, BOC Group announced it was cutting 1,500 jobs. In late 2002, the company merged its Japanese industrial and medical gas businesses with those of Air Liquide to form Japan Air Gases. BOC also acquired Praxair's operations in Poland.

In November 2003, BOC Group announced that it would complete the sale of Afrox Healthcare—a hospital and managed health care group operating in South Africa—to a consortium led by Black Economic Empowerment investors.

Part of the Linde Group (2006–present)
The BOC Group's total revenues in 2005, including its share of joint ventures and associate companies, were £4.6 billion and was then the second largest industrial gas supplier in the world. Industrial gases business made up for more than 80% of sales. The group was getting nearly one-third of its revenues from Asia Pacific; Europe accounted for 28% and the Americas 27%.

In January 2006, the Linde Group made a preliminary proposal to acquire BOC Group based on a £15 per share all-cash offer, which was rejected by the BOC board of directors. In March 2006, the second proposal based on a £16 per share all-cash offer, valuing the company at £8.2bn (US$14.4bn; €12bn), was accepted and takeover was completed on 5 September 2006. After nearly a century of intermittent courtship, BOC became a part of Linde Group and the synergy overtook Air Liquide as the global market leader.

On 6 September, BOC Group employees received a welcome pack including a letter from Linde CEO Professor Dr. Wolfgang Reitzle, a small badge representing the new logo of 'The Linde Group' and a Swatch watch. Many of these watches quickly appeared on eBay. On 12 March 2007, the Linde Group divested the vacuum business known as BOC Edwards to the private investment group CCMP Capital.

Operations
The BOC Group business activities included:

The Process Gas Solutions (PGS) line of business, supplying large product volumes by pipeline, on-site generation or cryogenic tanker
The Industrial and Special Products (ISP) line of business providing packaged gas, chemicals and related products and services. The gases involved are typically delivered in high pressure cylinders and range from technical grades to high-purity speciality gases.
BOC Edwards supplying the semiconductor industry with vacuum, chemical delivery and abatement systems and related services. It also supplies vacuum equipment to many industrial and scientific sectors.
Gist Limited provides logistics solutions, transport and warehousing to a number of sectors including food, beverage and fashion retail for large corporations including Marks & Spencer, Waitrose and Tesco

Headquarters
When BOC was a global company, the head office of BOC was in Windlesham, a small village approximately 25 miles south-west of London. The office, built in the 1980s is a fine example of modern architecture and when seen from the air resembles the shape of an oxygen molecule. This office was used by Kamkorp Group and then stood empty before being sold to Gordon Murray Automotive in February 2020.  Many of the staff that was based in the Windlesham office have since moved to the BOC office in Woking and Linde plc's head office in Munich, Germany.

See also
BOC Covent Garden Festival

References

External links
 

 

Chemical companies of the United Kingdom
Companies based in Guildford
Chemical companies established in 1886
Companies formerly listed on the London Stock Exchange
Linde plc
2006 mergers and acquisitions